Lost Soul is a play written by Dave Kirby, and performed at the Royal Court Theatre, Liverpool from 31 August to 29 September 2007.''

"In the 1970s Donna and Pat felt like the Pointer Sisters and they were looking for Hall and Oates. 30 years on and they feel like the ugly sisters and they found Laurel and Hardy. What happened to the fun times? Is the grass greener on the other side? Why has that daft get picked a fight with a bouncer?"

Cast
Donna - Lindzi Germain
Smigger - Andrew Schofield
Pat - Eithne Browne
Terry - Neil Caple
Barman - Lenny Wood
The Lion - Danny O'Brien
Girl - Jessica Schofield

Production team
 Director - Bob Eaton
 Production Manager - David Gordon
 Set Design - Billy Meall
 Lighting Design - Rob Beamer
 Sound Design - Charlie Brown
 Musical Director - Howard Gray/Adam Keast
 Producer - Kevin Fearon
 Chief LX & Lighting Operator - Andrew Patterson
 Sound Operator - Liam McDermott
 Stage Manager - Nicola Donithorn
 DSM - Ben Cowper
 Stage Crew & Flys - Mark Goodall
 Costume Supervisor - Marie Jones

References

External links  
 Royal Court Liverpool homepage 
 https://web.archive.org/web/20070808073155/http://www.royalcourtliverpool.co.uk/royalcourt/september/Sat1.htm
 Lost Soul Website

Culture in Liverpool
British plays
2007 plays
Fiction set in the 2000s